The 1945 shooting on Dam square took place during the liberation of Amsterdam on 7 May 1945, in the last days of World War II in Europe. German soldiers fired machine guns into a large crowd gathered on Dam square to celebrate the end of the war, killing over 30 people.

Background 

The German forces in the Netherlands surrendered to the Allies on 5 May 1945. However, the western part of the country remained occupied by the Germans until Allied troops could arrive to disarm them. Local newspapers reported on 6 May that Canadian forces would reach Amsterdam the next day.

On 7 May, thousands of people gathered on the Dam, the central square of the city, to celebrate the end of the war and welcome the Allied soldiers. Shortly after noon, a handful of Humber Armoured Cars of the British 49th (West Riding) Infantry Division began to approach the Dam by way of the Rokin to carry out reconnaissance. A convoy of German vehicles, also carrying out reconnaissance, narrowly passed the British vehicles near the Dam, but quickly disappeared again. The British, observing that the situation was potentially explosive, decided to withdraw from the city until forces of the Dutch resistance had successfully disarmed the Germans and taken possession of three key locations: the Royal Palace, the main money office and the main post office (Operation Three Castles).

Shooting 

In the nearby Paleisstraat, local forces arrested two German soldiers. One of them refused to surrender his weapon and fired a shot.

Large-scale panic broke out on Dam square and most of the crowd dispersed via the Nieuwendijk, Rokin and Damrak.

After the initial shots, a second round was fired. The Germans and resistance forces then started to exchange fire. In total, the shooting lasted about two hours, until about 5pm. Members of the Scouts, Red Cross and nurses attempted to aid the victims. The German soldiers at the  remained there until they were taken into custody by Canadian forces on 9 May and taken back to Germany.

German and local forces also exchanged fire at Amsterdam Centraal station that day, causing the death of two Dutch soldiers and a number of German soldiers.

Aftermath 
The day after the shooting, on 8 May, Canadian forces entered the city. Tens of thousands gathered on Dam square on 9 May to celebrate the liberation and listen to speeches by Prime Minister Gerbrandy and others.

The shooting was never fully investigated. After the event, local newspapers reported between 19 and 22 fatalities, but no official list of casualties was ever released. Stichting Memorial voor Damslachtoffers 7 mei 1945, an organisation founded to commemorate the event, has since identified a total of 32 people who died as a result of the event, not including German casualties. Twenty-six died immediately while five more died later of gunshot wounds. The last known victim died on 22 June. The actual number of fatalities may be higher; in some cases, it had not yet been determined whether the death was related to the Dam square shootout. The full number of wounded is also unknown; newspaper reports gave between 100 and 120 wounded.

Remembrance 

Between June 2015 and March 2016, 15,509 virtual stones were placed on the website plaatseensteen.nl / placeastone.nl, shaping the letters of the victims’ names. On 1 March 2016, the end result was transferred to stone reliefs and embedded in the pavement of Dam square. The memorial was unveiled by Mayor Eberhard van der Laan on 7 May 2016 following a ceremony in the Nieuwe Kerk church.

A national Remembrance of the Dead ceremony is held on Dam square every year on 4 May.

Carel Frederik Overhoff, who commanded the Dutch forces in Amsterdam on 7 May 1945, received the Military Order of William in 1947 for his efforts to put an end to the fighting, but the honour was rescinded in 1952 after Overhoff was convicted of embezzlement and imprisoned.

See also 
 History of Amsterdam
 Netherlands in World War II
 End of World War II in Europe
 Dolle Dinsdag

References

External links 

 Video footage of the events
 Gaia Rietveld, "Remembering Disaster. On the shooting on Dam Square May 7th 1945", Rampsporen

Dam Square
1940s in Amsterdam
Netherlands in World War II
Massacres in the Netherlands
Massacres committed by Nazi Germany